Aldéric Laurendeau (September 25, 1890 – January 11, 1961) was a Quebec politician and physician.

He was born in Saint-Gabriel-de-Brandon in the Lanaudière region of Quebec and worked as a doctor. He was a Liberal candidate in the 1945 federal election and was elected in the riding of Berthier-Maskinongé but did not run in the 1949 federal election.

Laurendeau was mayor of Saint-Gabriel-de-Brandon for eight years.

His cousin was novelist and Bloc populaire canadien politician André Laurendeau.

External links
 

1890 births
1961 deaths
Members of the House of Commons of Canada from Quebec
Liberal Party of Canada MPs
Mayors of places in Quebec